The Eastern Mediterranean Squadron later known as the British Aegean Squadron was a naval formation of the Mediterranean Fleet based at Mudros from 1914 to 1916. It then alternated between Mudros and Salonika from 1917 to 1919.

History
The Eastern Mediterranean Squadron was established in September 1914 as a sub-command of the Mediterranean Fleet.

It was heavily involved in the Naval operations in the Dardanelles campaign, 1915. Vice Admiral Carden directed operations from 19 February 1915 until early March. That day the Commander-in-Chief, Eastern Mediterranean had under his orders the Chief of Staff, East Mediterranean; the Second in Command, Eastern Mediterranean; and the Senior Naval Officer, Mudros.
On 19 February, two destroyers were sent in to probe the straits and the first shot was fired from Kumkale by the  Krupp guns of the Orhaniye Tepe battery at 07:58. The battleships  and  moved in to engage the forts and Cornwallis opened fire at 09:51. The effect of the long-range bombardment was considered disappointing and that it would take direct hits on guns to knock them out. With limited ammunition, indirect fire was insufficient and direct fire would need the ships to be anchored to make stable gun platforms. Ottoman casualties were reported as several men killed on the European shore and three men at Orkanie.

On 25 February the Allies attacked again, the Ottomans evacuated the outer defences, and the fleet entered the straits to engage the intermediate defences. Demolition parties of Royal Marines raided the Sedd el Bahr and Kum Kale forts, meeting little opposition. On 1 March, four battleships bombarded the intermediate defences but little progress was made clearing the minefields. The minesweepers, commanded by the chief of staff, Roger Keyes, were un-armoured trawlers manned by their civilian crews, who were unwilling to work while under fire. The strong current in the straits further hampered minesweeping and strengthened Ottoman resolve which had wavered at the start of the offensive; on 4 March, twenty-three marines were killed raiding the outer defences.

Queen Elizabeth was called on to engage the inner defences, at first from the Aegean coast near Gaba Tepe, firing across the peninsula and later in the straits. On the night of 13 March, the cruiser  led six minesweepers in an attempt to clear the mines. Four of the trawlers were hit and Amethyst was badly damaged with nineteen stokers killed from one hit. On 15 March, the Admiralty accepted a plan by Carden for another attack by daylight, with the minesweepers protected by the fleet. Carden was taken ill the same day and was replaced by Rear Admiral John de Robeck. A gunnery officer noted in his diary that de Robeck had already expressed misgivings about silencing the Ottoman guns by naval bombardment and that this view was widely held on board the ship.

The post was also styled as Commander-in-Chief, Eastern Mediterranean Squadron.

On 31 August 1915 Commodore Maurice S. FitzMaurice became Principal Naval Transport Officer, Mudros. From 20 January 1916 to June 1916 Fitzmaurice carried out the same duties from Salonika. 

In August 1917 the squadron was redesignated the British Aegean Squadron. It was gradually disbanded from May to September 1919.

Vice-Admirals Commanding, Eastern Mediterranean Squadron 
Post holders included:

Chief of Staff 
Post holders included:

Rear-Admirals, Second-in-Command 
Post holders included:

Senior Naval Officer, Mudros 
Post holders included:

Rear-Admirals, Commanding British Aegean Squadron 
Post holders included:

Captain of Base, Mudros 
Included:

Divisional Transport Officer, Salonika 
Included:

Notes

References 
 </ref> 
  .
 
 
  
 
 Marder, Arthur J. (2014). From the Dreadnought to Scapa Flow: Volume V Victory and Aftermath January 1918-June 1919. Barnsley, England: Seaforth Publishing. .
 Watson, Dr Graham (2015). "Royal Navy Organisation and Ship Deployment, Inter-War Years 1914-1918". www.naval-history.net. Gordon Smith.
 Woodward, David R. (2009). World War I Almanac. New York, NY, USA: Infobase Publishing. .

Royal Navy squadrons
Military units and formations established in 1914
Military units and formations disestablished in 1919
History of the Aegean Sea